Neda Arnerić (15 July 1953 – 10 January 2020) was a Serbian film, stage and television actress, and politician. A graduate art historian, she was considered a sex symbol of Yugoslav cinematography.

Personal life
Neda Arnerić was born in Knjaževac. Her mother was an ethnic Serb, whilst her father was an ethnic Croat, who worked as military doctor, born on the island of Korčula. Her grandfather was from Rovinj, where she often spent summers.

In 1980 she graduated from the University of Belgrade Faculty of Philosophy with a degree in Art History. In 1981 she married Serbian physician, Milorad Mešterović, who died in December 2018. They had no children. 

In February 2019, her brother Predrag found her unconscious, whereupon she spent 40 days at the Military Medical Academy in Belgrade. On 10 January 2020, she died aged 66. Her brother found her dead in her own home in the Belgrade municipality of Vračar, where she is believed to have suffered a heart attack.

Selected filmography
Venom ( The Legend of Spider Forest) (1971)
Shaft in Africa (1973)
The Republic of Užice (1974)
The Sensual Man (1974)
Who's That Singing Over There (1980)
The Elusive Summer of '68 (1984)
The End of the War (1984)
Taiwan Canasta (1985)
Aloa: Festivity of the Whores (1988)
Three Tickets to Hollywood (1993)
Impure Blood (1996)
Wheels (1998)
Natasha (2001)

References

External links

1953 births
People from Knjaževac
Serbian film actresses
Yugoslav film actresses
Serbian child actresses
Yugoslav child actresses
Serbian people of Croatian descent

Golden Arena winners
University of Belgrade Faculty of Philosophy alumni
2020 deaths
Members of the National Assembly (Serbia)
Democratic Party (Serbia) politicians